The 37th Arizona State Legislature, consisting of the Arizona State Senate and the Arizona House of Representatives, was constituted in Phoenix from January 1, 1985, to December 31, 1986, during the second two years of Bruce Babbitt's second full term as Governor of Arizona. Both the Senate and the House membership remained constant at 30 and 60, respectively. The composition of the senate remained constant, with the Republicans holding a 18–12, while the Democrats gained a seat in the lower house, decreasing the Republican majority to 38–22.

Sessions
The Legislature met for two regular sessions at the State Capitol in Phoenix. The first opened on January 14, 1985, and adjourned on May 8, while the Second Regular Session convened on January 13, 1986, and adjourned sine die on May 14. There were no special sessions.

State Senate

Members

The asterisk (*) denotes members of the previous Legislature who continued in office as members of this Legislature.

House of Representatives

Members 
The asterisk (*) denotes members of the previous Legislature who continued in office as members of this Legislature.

References

Arizona legislative sessions
1985 in Arizona
1986 in Arizona
1985 U.S. legislative sessions
1986 U.S. legislative sessions